Howard Levitt (born 1952) is a Canadian lawyer, author, and columnist. He is a senior partner at the Toronto employment law firm Levitt Sheikh LLP. Levitt has published six employment law books, including The Law of Dismissal in Canada. He writes a weekly column for the Financial Post.

Early life 
Howard Alan Levitt was born in 1952.
Levitt was raised in Hamilton, Ontario. He attended the University of Toronto, where he obtained his Bachelor of Laws degree in 1977. He did courses at Harvard Law School, following that, obtaining his Negotiation and Advanced Negotiation Certificate under Roger Fisher.

Career

Legal career 
Levitt was called to the Ontario Bar in 1979. He started his career as an employment lawyer specializing in wrongful dismissal.

Levitt worked on several prolific cases in his early career. In 1987, he represented Betty Stone, who worked for the Toronto branch of the National Council of Jewish Women. Stone lost her employment as executive director after investigating the political contributions of fundraiser Patti Starr. Known as the Patti Starr affair, the legal proceedings received prominent news coverage and he acted for her before the Houlden Commission. This case contributed to the collapse of the David Peterson provincial Liberal government since many cabinet ministers were involved with Starr.

Levitt also represented Yolanda Ballard, the long-time companion of the Toronto Maple Leafs owner Harold Ballard. After Ballard died in 1990, Yolanda had a legal dispute with his children over the estate, documented extensively in the news.

In the early 1990s, Levitt represented Marek Machtinger, a car dealership employee who disputed the severance pay and termination clause against his former employer. He argued the dismissal did not meet Ontario's Employment Standards Act (ESA). The Machtinger v. HOJ Industries Ltd. case reached the Supreme Court of Canada in 1992, in which Levitt won the appeal. The Supreme Court of Canada ruled in favour of Machtinger, stating that employers must comply with the requirements of the ESA. Levitt has acted as lead counsel in more employment law cases before the Supreme Court of Canada and at more provincial Courts of Appeal than any other lawyer in Canadian history.

Levitt developed his career at Lang Michener, which has since rebranded itself as McMillan LLP. In 2011, Levitt started his employment law firm, Levitt LLP. His clients have included the Business Development Bank of Canada, Corus Entertainment, CPA Canada, Rogers Communications, Shaw Communications, and The Co-operators. His firm worked on the Matthews v. Ocean Nutrition Canada Ltd. case, which reached the Supreme Court for its verdict. Levitt's team represented Matthews, a former Ocean Nutrition Canada employee who sought damages over his exclusion from the company's long-term incentive plan (LTIP). In 2020, the Supreme Court of Canada unanimously ruled that Matthews was entitled to over $1 million in damages for the loss of the LTIP payments. In February 2023, he co-counselled with local counsel and won the largest compensation ever awarded for an employment law case in New Brunswick.

Political career 
Levitt was Ontario Counsel for the Jean Chretien for Leadership campaign in 1990. At the time of the Meech Lake Accord, Levitt was co-chair, along with the Honourable John Roberts, of ALARM, an organization of Liberals across Canada opposing the Accord which included Premiers and provincial Opposition Leaders. Pierre Trudeau provided this group with support at the time.

Author 
In 1985, Levitt authored The Law of Dismissal in Canada, a bestselling book analyzing wrongful dismissal cases. A Dalhousie Journal of Legal Studies reviewer praised it as "an indispensable addition to any course on employment law." After his first publication, Levitt also wrote five other books in his career. His titles include The Law of Dismissal for Human Resources Professionals and War Stories from the Workplace: Columns by Howard Levitt. Since 1985, he has been Editor-in-Chief of the Dismissal and Employment Law Digest covering all employment law cases across Canada.

Columnist 
Levitt has a twice weekly column in the Financial Post section of the National Post. He writes about legal topics in the workplace. Levitt appears in radio programs, such as 680 News. Over the years, he has been interviewed regularly by numerous media sources as an authority on labour law, including CBC News, CTV News, Global News, Reuters, The Wall Street Journal, and The New York Times. He is interviewed more than any other lawyer in Canada in any field.

Philanthropy 
Levitt's philanthropy includes giving $1,000,000 to the Sinai Health Foundation, a charitable organization serving Mount Sinai Hospital. In 2022, Levitt donated a large sum to the University of Toronto Faculty of Law. The funds support the law school's Indigenous initiatives and postgraduate research. An Indigenous sculpture, donated by Levitt, will be placed in the Howard and Pamela Levitt Square at Falconer Hall.

Awards 
Levitt received the Governor General's Award for Community Service and Citizenship in 2012.

References

External links 
 Levitt Sheikh LLP
 Howard Levitt - Financial Post column

1952 births
Living people
Canadian lawyers
Lawyers in Ontario
Canadian legal writers
Canadian columnists
University of Toronto alumni